Eclipse De Luna is the debut solo album by Mexican singer Maite Perroni. It was released on August 23, 2013 through Warner Music . Its physical edition was distributed four days later. On September 6, Maite Perroni announced her record label was going to launch a Brazilian edition with appearance by Thiaguinho.

Background
In February 2013, it was announced that the singer moved to New York City to study music and prepare her solo debut album. On April 12, 2013, during an interview with People en Español, Perroni stated - "It is a hard pretentious. We are not here to bring sounds never heard before. Just want to feel , to move the body and soul. I've been writing for a couple of weeks and need to record four songs to finish the album."

On June 17, 2013, through a twit cam, Perroni released the lyric video for the song " Tú y Yo"; the first single from the album in her official channel on YouTube. The single's release was scheduled for June 14, but was released on June 18, 2013, digitally.

Track listing

1ª Vas A Querer Volver
2ª Tu Y Yo
3ª Eclipse De Luna
4ª Todo Lo Que Soy
5ª Inexplicable
6ª Como Yo
7ª Me Va
8ª Y Lloro
9ª Agua Bendita
10ª Llueve Llueve
11ª Melancolia (Saudade)
12ª Que Te Hace Falta
13ª Sueno Contigo
14ª Ojos Divinos
15ª Los Cangrejos
16ª Loca De Amor
17ª Te Daré Mi Corazón

Charts 
The album debuted on the Billboard Top Latin Albums at number 9 and at number 2 on the Latin Pop Albums. On the Mexican Albums Chart the album debuted at number 3.

Year-end charts

Singles

References

Maite Perroni albums
2013 debut albums